Dieter Renner (born 18 December 1949 in Giengen; died 28 May 1998 in Ruit auf den Fildern) was a German football player and coach.

Honours

As a coach
 DFB-Pokal finalist: 1986–87

References

1949 births
1998 deaths
German footballers
German football managers
Stuttgarter Kickers players
Stuttgarter Kickers managers
Kickers Offenbach managers
SV Darmstadt 98 managers
1. FC Nürnberg managers
Bundesliga managers
2. Bundesliga players

Association football midfielders
Footballers from Baden-Württemberg